Bathanalia straeleni is a species of tropical freshwater snail with an operculum, aquatic gastropod mollusk in the family Paludomidae.

This species found in Burundi, the Democratic Republic of the Congo, Tanzania, and Zambia. Its natural habitat is intermittent freshwater lakes.

References

Further reading 
 Strong E. E. & Glaubrecht M. (2010). "Anatomy of the Tiphobiini from Lake Tanganyika (Cerithioidea, Paludomidae)". Malacologia 52(1): 115-153. .

Paludomidae
Gastropods described in 1953
Taxonomy articles created by Polbot